Sima Milovanov (Serbian Cyrillic: Сима Милованов; 10 April 1923 – 16 November 2002) was a Serbian footballer who was part of Yugoslavia national football team at the 1954 FIFA World Cup. He later became a manager with Cyprus.

References

External links
 Profile at Reprezentacija.rs

1923 births
2002 deaths
People from Bečej
Serbian footballers
Yugoslav footballers
Yugoslavia international footballers
Association football defenders
FK Vojvodina players
Yugoslav First League players
1954 FIFA World Cup players
Serbian football managers
Yugoslav football managers
Veria F.C. managers
Cyprus national football team managers
Anorthosis Famagusta F.C. managers
Serbian expatriate football managers
Expatriate football managers in Cyprus
Nea Salamis Famagusta FC managers
NK Osijek managers